In mathematics, the paratingent cone and contingent cone were introduced by , and are closely related to tangent cones.

Definition
Let  be a nonempty subset of a real normed vector space .

An equivalent definition is given in terms of a distance function and the limit infimum.
As before, let  be a normed vector space and take some nonempty set . For each , let the distance function to  be 
 

References

Mathematical analysis